The Valea Danului is a right tributary of the river Argeș in Romania. It flows into the Argeș near Curtea de Argeș.

References

Rivers of Romania
Rivers of Argeș County